Pentatropis  is a genus of plants in the family Apocynaceae, first described as a genus in 1834. It is native to Africa and southern Asia.

Species

formerly included
moved to other genera (Cynanchum, Daemia, Rhyncharrhena, Vincetoxicum)

References

Asclepiadoideae
Apocynaceae genera